Andreas Sebastian Weigend (born 1961) is the author of the book Data for the People (Basic Books, 2017). He was a member of Germany's Digital Council under Merkel, Digitalrat.

He formerly taught the course "Social Data Revolution" on applications of predictive analytics and the impact of big data and artificial intelligence on individuals, business and society at Stanford, the University of California at Berkeley and at Fudan in Shanghai.
Weigend studied physics and philosophy at the University of Bonn and received a PhD in physics from Stanford University in 1991. He was formerly employed at Amazon.com.

References

External links 

 Personal Website
 

American computer scientists
Living people
1961 births
University of Bonn alumni
Stanford University alumni